The Roman Catholic Diocese of Barra do Piraí–Volta Redonda is a diocese located in the cities of Barra do Piraí and Volta Redonda in the Ecclesiastical province of São Sebastião do Rio de Janeiro in Brazil.

History
 4 December 1922: Established as Diocese of Barra do Piraí from the Diocese of Niterói
 26 January 1965: Renamed as Diocese of Barra do Piraí–Volta Redonda

Bishops
 Bishops of Barra do Piraí (Latin Rite) 
 Guilherme Müller (1925.12.14 – 1935.12.11)
 José André Coimbra (1938.02.26 – 1955.06.08), appointed Bishop of Patos de Minas, Minas Gerais
 Agnelo Rossi (1956.03.05 – 1962.09.06), appointed Archbishop of Ribeirão Preto, São Paulo; future Cardinal
 Altivo Pacheco Ribeiro (1963.04.04 – 1965.01.26)
 Bishops of Barra do Piraí-Volta Redonda (Latin Rite)
 Altivo Pacheco Ribeiro (1965.01.26 – 1966.06.27), appointed Bishop of Araçuaí (Arassuaí), Minas Gerais
 Waldyr Calheiros Novaes (1966.10.20 – 1999.11.17)
 João Maria Messi, O.S.M. (1999.11.17 – 2011.06.08, retired)
 Francesco Biasin (2011.06.08 – 2013.03.13)
 Luiz Henrique da Silva Brito (2013.03.13 - present)

Auxiliary bishop
Vital João Geraldo Wilderink, O. Carm. (1978-1980), appointed Bishop of Itaguaí, Rio de Janeiro

References
 GCatholic.org
 Catholic Hierarchy
 Diocese website (Portuguese) 

Roman Catholic dioceses in Brazil
Christian organizations established in 1922
Barra do Pirai-Volta Redonda, Roman Catholic Diocese of
Roman Catholic dioceses and prelatures established in the 20th century